Angelo Zottoli (1826–1902) was an Italian Catholic priest and missionary in China and a sinologist.

Biography 
Zottoli was born in Acerno in June 21, 1826 and, after joining the Jesuits in 1843, went as a missionary to China in 1848. From 1853 he taught, and was headmaster, in St. Ignatius College for Chinese Christian students founded in 1849.

He was known for his sinological works, and was an important leader in the Shanghai Catholic community of Zikawei, encouraging figures such as Ma Xiangbo to carefully study the Chinese and Western classics.

Sinology 
Zottoli produced a Latin textbook of Chinese Language Cursus litterature Sinicae neo-missionariis accommodatus in five volumes in octavo. He also produced Latin translations of some classic works of Chinese literature (Confucius), a Chinese-Latin dictionary, and many theological texts in Chinese.

In 1884 he was awarded the Prix Stanislas Julien by the Académie des Inscriptions et Belles-Lettres of Paris for his Cursus litteraturae Sinicae neo-missionariis accommodatus.

References 

1826 births
1902 deaths
19th-century Italian Jesuits
Italian sinologists
Italian lexicographers
Italian Latinists
Italian translators
Italian male non-fiction writers
Italian Roman Catholic missionaries
Italian emigrants to China
Jesuit missionaries in China
19th-century translators
19th-century Italian male writers
Translators to Latin
Translators from Chinese
Missionary linguists
19th-century Latin-language writers
Latin-language writers from Italy
19th-century lexicographers